Manjeet Singh Ral (Punjabi: ਮਨਜੀਤ ਸਿੰਘ ਰਾਲ, born 24 January 1975), better known by his stage-name Manj Musik, is a British Indian composer, singer and Filmi scorer. He was one of the music composer for the bhangra music group RDB, which was formed with his two brothers Surjeet Singh (SurjRDB) and Kuldeep Ral in 2000.

Career
Manj Musik started his musical journey with RDB group singing at their local gurudwara.

After the death of the older brother Kuljeet Ral, Manj Musik decided to leave RDB. Beginning his solo career in 2014, At that same year he was awarded "Best Urban Single" at the Brit Asia TV Music Awards for "Swag Mera Desi" by himself and Raftaar.

Manj Musik began producing his own singles and also began to produce music in Bollywood, and has worked with established actors such as Saif Ali Khan, Shahrukh Khan and Akshay Kumar, among others. In 2014 Manj founded his own music label Muzik ONE Records.

Muzik ONE records 

Muzik ONE Records is a Mumbai-based record label founded by British Indian singer, music director, and producer Manj Musik in 2014. Later renamed as Muzik ONE Global, Manj described that the label is built to give full marketing, promotions and financial support to up and coming independent artists and not the label itself. Current signed artists under the label are the famous Indian hip hop crew KKG (Sikander Kahlon, Saddy Immortal, Rob C), Vee Music, Abeer Arora, Moyur, O2 & SRK, Mr.Richi, Sarb Smooth, Nindy Kaur, Manj Musik, and Raftaar.

Discography

Artist Discography

Singles

Film soundtracks

References

Living people
British male singer-songwriters
British rappers of Indian descent
1985 births
Musicians from Bradford
British people of Punjabi descent